Alan Wolf Arkin (born March 26, 1934) is an American actor, director and screenwriter known for his performances on stage and screen. Throughout his career spanning over six decades, he has received various accolades, including an Academy Award, two Screen Actors Guild Awards, a British Academy Film Award, a Golden Globe Award, and a Tony Award.

Arkin started his career on the Broadway stage acting in Enter Laughing in 1963 for which he received the Tony Award for Best Featured Actor in a Play, and the comedic play Luv (1964). He is also was nominated for the Tony Award for Best Direction of a Play for The Sunshine Boys in 1973.

He gained stardom acting in The Russians Are Coming, the Russians Are Coming (1966), Wait Until Dark (1967), The Heart Is a Lonely Hunter (1968), Popi (1969), Catch-22 (1970), The In-Laws (1979), Edward Scissorhands (1990), Glengarry Glen Ross (1992), Grosse Point Blank (1997), Thirteen Conversations About One Thing (2001), Little Miss Sunshine (2006), Get Smart (2008), and Argo (2012). For his performance in Little Miss Sunshine, he won the Academy Award for Best Supporting Actor, and BAFTA Award for Best Actor in a Supporting Role.

He is also known for his roles in television including his performances as Leon Felhendler in Escape from Sobibor (1987), and as Harry Rowen in The Pentagon Papers (2003) which he earned Primetime Emmy Award for Outstanding Lead Actor in a Limited or Series or Movie nominations. From 2015 to 2016 he voiced J.D. Salinger in the Netflix animated series BoJack Horseman. From 2018 to 2019 he starred in the Netflix comedy series The Kominsky Method, earning two consecutive Primetime Emmy Award for Outstanding Supporting Actor in a Comedy Series nomination.

Early life and education 
Arkin was born in Brooklyn New York, on March 26, 1934, the son of David I. Arkin, a painter and writer and his wife, Beatrice (née Wortis), a teacher. He was raised in a Jewish family with "no emphasis on religion". His grandparents were Jewish immigrants from Ukraine, Russia, and Germany. His parents moved to Los Angeles when Alan was 11, but an 8-month Hollywood strike cost his father his job as a set designer. During the 1950s Red Scare, Arkin's parents were accused of being Communists, and his father was fired when he refused to answer questions about his political ideology. David Arkin challenged the dismissal, but he was vindicated only after his death.

Arkin, who had been taking acting lessons since age 10, became a scholarship student at various drama academies, including one run by the Stanislavsky student Benjamin Zemach, who taught Arkin a psychological approach to acting. Arkin attended Los Angeles State College from 1951 to 1953. He also attended Bennington College.

Career

1960s: Early work and stardom 

 Early roles and Broadway debut

Arkin was an early member of the Second City comedy troupe in the 1960s. In 1957 he made his feature film acting debut in a small role the musical film Calypso Heat Wave. In the early sixties he appeared in episodes of East Side/West Side (1964), and ABC Stage 67 (1966). He also made his Broadway debut as a performer in From the Second City at the Royale Theatre in 1961.

He starred in 1963 on Broadway as David Kolowitz in Joseph Stein's comedic play Enter Laughing. Critic Howard Taubman of The New York Times gave the play a mixed review but praised Arkin's performance, describing it as "a choice specimen of a shrewd actor ribbing his profession". For his performance he received the Tony Award for Best Featured Actor in a Play, and a Theatre World Award. The following year he returned to Broadway starring as Harry Berlin in Luv directed by Mike Nichols. Arkin starred opposite Eli Wallach and Anne Jackson.

 Film work and stardom 

Arkin is one of only six actors to receive an Academy Award nomination for Best Actor for their first screen appearance (for The Russians Are Coming, the Russians Are Coming in 1966). 
In 1966 he starred in Norman Jewison's comedy film The Russians Are Coming, the Russians Are Coming opposite Carl Reiner, and Eva Marie Saint. Robert Alden of The New York Times praised Arkin's performance describing it as his, "first full-length film appearance and a particularly wonderful performance". For his performance Arkin received a Academy Award for Best Actor nomination and a BAFTA Award for Most Promising Newcomer nomination. He also received the Golden Globe Award for Best Actor – Motion Picture Musical or Comedy. 
The following year he appeared in Vittorio De Sica sex comedy film Woman Times Seven starring Shirley MacLaine, and Terence Young's psychological thriller film Wait Until Dark starring Audrey Hepburn.

In 1968 he starred as Inspector Jacques Clouseau in the third installment of The Pink Panther franchise, titled Inspector Clouseau, after Peter Sellers dissociated himself from the role. The film was not well received by Sellers' fans and critics but Penelope Gilliatt of The New Yorker called it "an incredibly bad film, but Alan Arkin is sometimes very funny in it, especially when he doesn't try to be." That same year he starred as a deaf mute in a small southern town during the depression era in The Heart Is a Lonely Hunter (1968). For his performance he received nominations for the Academy Award for Best Actor, and the Golden Globe Award for Best Actor – Motion Picture Drama. He also won the New York Film Critics Circle Award for Best Actor. In 1969 he starred in Arthur Hiller's comedy Popi opposite Rita Moreno. The film focuses on a Puerto Rican widower struggling to raise his two young sons in the New York City neighborhood of Spanish Harlem. Arkin received another nomination for the Golden Globe Award for Best Actor – Motion Picture Drama.

In 1969, Arkin's directorial debut was the Oscar-nominated 12-minute children's film titled People Soup, starring his sons Adam Arkin and Matthew Arkin. Based on a story of the same name he published in Galaxy Science Fiction in 1958, People Soup is a fantasy about two boys who experiment with various kitchen ingredients until they concoct a magical soup which transforms them into different animals and objects.

1970s: Established actor 

 Comedies and dramas 

In 1970 Arkin starred as  Capt. John Yossarian in the Mike Nichols film Catch-22. The film is a satirical black comedy war film adapted from the 1961 novel of the same name by Joseph Heller. Arkin co-starred alongside Bob Balaban, Martin Balsam, Buck Henry, Bob Newhart, Austin Pendleton, Martin Sheen, Jon Voight and Orson Welles. Arkin received a Laurel Award nomination for his performance. Arkin and his second wife Barbara Dana appeared together on the 1970–1971 season of Sesame Street as a comical couple named Larry and Phyllis who resolve their conflicts when they remember how to pronounce the word "cooperate."

His most acclaimed directorial effort is Little Murders, released in 1971. Written by cartoonist Jules Feiffer, it is a black comedy film starring Elliott Gould and Marcia Rodd about a girl, Patsy (Rodd), who brings home her boyfriend Alfred (Gould) to meet her dysfunctional family amid a series of random shootings, garbage strikes, and electrical outages ravaging the neighborhood. The film opened to a lukewarm review by Roger Greenspan, and a more positive one by Vincent Canby in The New York Times. Roger Ebert's review in the Chicago Sun-Times was enthusiastic, stating "One of the reasons it works and is indeed a definitive reflection of America's darker moods is that it breaks audiences down into isolated individuals, vulnerable and uncertain." Arkin also directed Fire Sale (1977)

During the 1970s Arkin starred in films of various genres including the Vernon Zimmerman road comedy Deadhead Miles (1972), the Gene Saks adaptation of the Neil Simon play of the same name Last of the Red Hot Lovers (1972), the black comedy action film Freebie and the Bean (1974), the dramedy Rafferty and the Gold Dust Twins (1975), the western comedy Hearts of the West (1975), and the British mystery The Seven-Per-Cent Solution (1976). In 1979 he starred and co-produced the buddy comedy film The In-Laws. Arkin starred opposite Peter Falk in a film directed by Arthur Hiller written by Andrew Bergman. The film was a financial and critical success.

In 1975, Arkin directed the Broadway production of Neil Simon's The Sunshine Boys. He received the Tony Award for Best Direction of a Play nomination.

1980s: Escape from Sobibor 
In 1980 Arkin starred in the Marshall Brickman comedy Simon which gained mixed reviews but earned him a Saturn Award nomination. The following year he starred in three comedy films, Improper Channels, Chu Chu and the Philly Flash opposite Carol Burnett, and Full Moon High. During the 1980s, Arkin appeared frequently in various television programs including The Muppet Show and St. Elsewhere. Arkin later appeared in 1987 on the sitcom Harry, which was canceled after four low-rated episodes. In 1985 Arkin starred in the television film The Fourth Wise Man starring Martin Sheen, and Eileen Brennan.

In 1987, he starred in another television film Escape from Sobibor portraying Leon Felhendler. The film revolves around the mass escape from the Nazi extermination camp at Sobibor. Arkin received nominations for the Primetime Emmy Award for Outstanding Lead Actor in a Limited or Anthology Series or Movie and the Golden Globe Award for Best Supporting Actor – Series, Miniseries or Television Film.

1990s: Supporting roles 
In 1990, Arkin appeared in a supporting role in Tim Burton's fantasy romance Edward Scissorhands starring Johnny Depp and Winona Ryder. He also appeared in the live action Disney film The Rocketeer (1991) starring Bill Campbell and Jennifer Connelly, and the film adaptation of the David Mamet play Glengarry Glen Ross (1992) starring Al Pacino, Jack Lemmon, and Kevin Spacey. In 1993, he appeared in the comedies Indian Summer and So I Married an Axe Murderer. The following year Arkin starred in the Rob Reiner film North.

In 1996 Arkin appeared in the film adaptation of the Kurt Vonnegut novel Mother Night starring Nick Nolte, Sheryl Lee, John Goodman, and Kirsten Dunst. The following year Arkin appeared in the comedy Grosse Point Blank starring John Cusack and Minnie Driver as well as the dystopian science fiction film Gattaca starring Ethan Hawke and Uma Thurman. Arkin also Directed Samuel Beckett Is Coming Soon (1993), and Arigo (2000).

2000s: Little Miss Sunshine 
In 2001 he appeared in the comedy America's Sweethearts starring John Cusack, Julia Roberts, Billy Crystal, and Catherine Zeta-Jones. He also starred in the Jill Sprecher directed drama Thirteen Conversations About One Thing with Matthew McConaughey, John Turturro, and Clea DuVall. For his performance he received the Boston Society of Film Critics Award for Best Supporting Actor. In 2003 he starred in the television film The Pentagon Papers starring James Spader and Paul Giamatti for which he received a Primetime Emmy Award for Outstanding Supporting Actor in a Limited or Anthology Series or Movie nomination. That same year he starred in another television film And Starring Pancho Villa as Himself starring Antonio Banderas. In 2005 he appeared as Marty Adler in the NBC sitcom Will & Grace in the episode "It's a Dad, Dad, Dad, Dad World".

In 2006, Arkin appeared in a supporting role in the ensemble comedy-drama Little Miss Sunshine opposite Greg Kinnear, Steve Carell, Toni Collette, Paul Dano, and Abigail Breslin. His role in the independent film Little Miss Sunshine as a foul-mouthed grandfather with a taste for snorting heroin won him the BAFTA Award for Best Actor in a Supporting Role and the Academy Award for Best Actor in a Supporting Role. At 72 years old, Arkin was the sixth oldest winner of the Best Supporting Actor Oscar. On receiving his Academy Award on February 25, 2007, Arkin said:

In 2006–2007, Arkin was cast in supporting roles in Rendition as a U.S. Senator and The Santa Clause 3: The Escape Clause as Bud Newman (Carol's Father). In 2008 he appeared in the comedy films Sunshine Cleaning with Emily Blunt and Amy Adams, Get Smart opposite Steve Carell and Anne Hathaway and Marley & Me starring Owen Wilson and Jennifer Aniston. The following year he appeared in Rebecca Miller's The Private Lives of Pippa Lee and Raymond De Felitta's City Island (both 2010).

2010s: Continued work
In 2012 he appeared in a supporting role as a Hollywood agent Lester Siegel in Ben Affleck's drama Argo with Affleck, John Goodman, and Bryan Cranston. For his performance he received his fourth Academy Award nomination, his second for Best Supporting Actor losing to Christoph Waltz in Django Unchained. He also received nominations for the Golden Globe Award, the BAFTA Award, and Screen Actors Guild Award. He did receive the Screen Actors Guild Award for Outstanding Performance by a Cast in a Motion Picture. That same year he appeared in the crime drama Stand Up Guys opposite Al Pacino and Christopher Walken. The following year he appeared in the comedy The Incredible Burt Wonderstone with Steve Carell, Steve Buscemi, Olivia Wilde and Jim Carrey and Grudge Match with Robert De Niro, Sylvester Stallone, and Kim Basinger. He continued to act in supporting roles in films such as the sports drama Million Dollar Arm (2014) with Jon Hamm, the Christmas comedy Love the Coopers (2015), the comedy Going in Style (2017) with Morgan Freeman and Michael Caine and Tim Burton's Dumbo (2019).

From 2015 to 2016 Arkin voiced J.D. Salinger in the Netflix animated series BoJack Horseman. From 2018 to 2019 he starred opposite Michael Douglas in the Netflix series The Kominsky Method for which he received two Primetime Emmy Award for Outstanding Supporting Actor in a Comedy Series nominations, two Golden Globe Award for Best Supporting Actor – Series, Miniseries or Television Film nominations and four Screen Actors Guild Award nominations.

Bibliography
Arkin is the author of many books, including Tony's Hard Work Day (illustrated by James Stevenson, 1972), The Lemming Condition (illustrated by Joan Sandin, 1976), Halfway Through the Door: An Actor's Journey Toward Self (1979), and The Clearing (1986 continuation of Lemming). He has released two memoirs: An Improvised Life (2011) and Out of My Mind (2018).

Singing
With two friends, he formed the folk group The Tarriers, in which Arkin sang and played guitar. The band members co-composed the group's 1956 hit "The Banana Boat Song", a reworking, with some new lyrics, of a traditional, Jamaican calypso folk song of the same name, combined with another titled "Hill and Gully Rider". It reached No. 4 on the Billboard magazine chart the same year as Harry Belafonte's better-known hit version. The group appeared in the 1957 Calypso-exploitation film Calypso Heat Wave, singing "Banana Boat Song" and "Choucoune". Arkin was a member of The Tarriers when they recorded "Cindy, Oh Cindy" which went to the top of the charts.

From 1958 to 1968, Arkin performed and recorded with the children's folk group The Baby Sitters. He also performed the role of Dr. Pangloss in a concert staging of Leonard Bernstein's operetta Candide, alongside Madeline Kahn's Cunegonde. In 1985, he sang two selections by Jones and Schmidt on Ben Bagley's album Contemporary Broadway Revisited.

Personal life
Arkin has been married three times, with two ending in divorce. He and Jeremy Yaffe (m. 1955–1961) have two sons: Adam Arkin, born August 19, 1956, and Matthew Arkin, born March 21, 1960. He was married to actress-screenwriter Barbara Dana from 1964 to 1994: she appeared with him in segments of Sesame Street in the 1970s. They lived in Chappaqua, New York. In 1967, they had a son, Anthony (Tony) Dana Arkin. In 1996, Arkin married psychotherapist Suzanne Newlander, whose surname he adopted for his character Norman Newlander in The Kominsky Method. They live in Carlsbad, California.

Filmography

Film

Television

Theatre

Awards and nominations 

In 2014, Arkin received the Gregory Peck Award for Cinematic Excellence to honor his life's work at the San Diego Film Festival.

See also
 List of oldest and youngest Academy Award winners and nominees

References

External links
 
 
 
 
 

 Q&A with Arkin at Time.com
 Folkera Tarriers article
 Stephen Capen Interview on Worldguide, Futurist Radio Hour – October 10, 1995

 Videos
  photo compilation
 
 
 
 
 
 Rifftrax's treatment of People Soup on official YouTube channel

1934 births
Living people
20th-century American comedians
21st-century American comedians
20th-century American male actors
21st-century American male actors
American children's writers
American male film actors
American male stage actors
American male television actors
American people of German-Jewish descent
American people of Russian-Jewish descent
American people of Ukrainian-Jewish descent
Best Musical or Comedy Actor Golden Globe (film) winners
Best Performance by a Foreign Actor Genie Award winners
Best Supporting Actor Academy Award winners
Best Supporting Actor BAFTA Award winners
Best Supporting Actor Genie and Canadian Screen Award winners
Drama Desk Award winners
Independent Spirit Award for Best Supporting Male winners
Jewish American male actors
Jewish American writers
Male actors from New York City
Outstanding Performance by a Cast in a Motion Picture Screen Actors Guild Award winners
People from Brooklyn
Tony Award winners
21st-century American Jews